Tin Jingyao (born July 2000) is a Singaporean chess grandmaster. He is a five-time winner of the Singapore Chess Championship and represented Singapore in the Chess Olympiad in 2014 and 2016. 

In August 2022, Tin was awarded the title of Grandmaster (GM) by FIDE and became the youngest player in Singapore to achieve the title.

Early life and education 
As of October 2022, Tin is currently pursuing a degree in computing at the National University of Singapore.

Chess career
Tin began playing chess in 2008. In 2010, Tin represented Singapore in the 11th ASEAN Chess Championships (Open U10 category) and won the only gold medal for Singapore.

Tin achieved his first Grandmaster norm in 2015 by winning the Asean Under-20 chess tournament and was directly awarded the title of International Master.

He has won the Singapore Chess Championship five times; in 2016, 2017, 2018, 2019 and 2021. He also represented Singapore in the Chess Olympiad in 2014 (5.5/10 on board 4) and 2016 (5/10 on board 3).

He qualified for the Chess World Cup 2021 where he was defeated by Timur Gareyev on tiebreaks in the first round.

Tin achieved his third Grandmaster norm at the Hanoi Grandmaster Chess Tournament in May 2022.

In December 2022, Tin finished second place in the III Elllobregat Open Chess tournament where he defeated Hans Niemann in the seventh round of the tournament.

References

External links
 
 

2000 births
Living people
Chess Olympiad competitors
Singaporean chess players
Singaporean sportspeople of Chinese descent
Competitors at the 2021 Southeast Asian Games
Southeast Asian Games competitors for Singapore
21st-century Singaporean people